The Ambassador of India to Romania is the Republic of India's foremost diplomatic representative and head of India's diplomatic mission in Romania. The Ambassador resides in Bucharest and is concurrently accredited as a non-resident Ambassador to both Albania and Moldova.

List of Indian Ambassadors to Romania 

The current ambassador is Rahul Shrivastava who succeeded Thanglura Darlong in July, 2020.

See also 
 India–Romania relations

References 

 
Romania
India